Jessica Ann Gysin (born December 4, 1985) is a female American volleyball player. She went to St. Francis High in Mountain View, California and played collegiately for the USC. Gysin plays as Outside Hitter. She was born in Santa Cruz, California. She is married to former NFL quarterback Jimmy Clausen.

References 

1985 births
Living people
American women's volleyball players
Sportspeople from Santa Cruz, California
USC Trojans women's volleyball players
Outside hitters
Volleyball players from California